A conversion coating is a chemical or electro-chemical treatment applied to manufactured parts that superficially converts the material into a thin adhering coating of an insoluble compound. These coatings are commonly applied to protect the part against corrosion, to improve the adherence of other coatings, for lubrication, or for aesthetic purposes.

Types

The most common conversion coating processes for metal parts with industrial use include

 Chromate (aluminum, steel)
 Phosphate (steel)
 Bluing (steel)
 Black oxide (steel)
 Anodizing (aluminum)
 Stannate (magnesium)
 Molybdate (zinc, zinc-nickel)
 Zirconate (steel, aluminum, magnesium, galvanized steel).
 Titanate (steel, aluminum, magnesium).
 Plasma electrolysis (aluminum, magnesium, titanium)

Non-metallic substrates
Conversion coatings have been studied for non-metallic substrates, such as for protection of fluorozirconate glasses used in optoelectronics.

Regulations
US military specifications for conversion coatings include MIL-DTL-5541, MIL-DTL-81706, and MIL-DTL-5574, all dealing with aluminum.

See also 
 Rust converter – tannate conversion coating

References 

Coatings